Fubá may refer to:

Gilmar Fubá, Brazilian footballer
Tico-Tico no Fubá, Brazilian song
Tico-Tico no Fubá (film), Brazilian film